Salim Shaheen is an Afghan actor, producer and filmmaker. He has made over 100 films and is the subject of the documentary The Prince of Nothingwood.

Career
Salim Shaheen has made over 100 films in Afghanistan despite the Taliban forbidding the capture of images. The low-budget films are popular and tend to be action-orientated, influenced by Bollywood and kung fu film. He made his first production at the age of 16. Shaheen is known by the nicknames Afghanistan's Steven Spielberg and Sultan-e-cinema.
During the Afghan Civil War (1989–1992) Shaheen was a military commander and continued to make films using his soldiers as actors.

In 1995, a filmset was bombed and nine of Shaheen's crew were killed. His film Debt was made in 2004 and led to him becoming nationally famous. French journalist Sonia Kronlund made the documentary The Prince of Nothingwood about Shaheen in 2017. This resulted in him visiting the Cannes Film Festival and Mumbai International Film Festival with the film.

Personal life 
Shaheen was born in 1957 on Kabul, Afghanistan. He fell in love with Bollywood cinema when he saw Yaadon Ki Baaraat at the age of 8. He is married with 14 children. Between 1997 and 2004, he lived in Pakistan. Shaheen was arrested for cyber crime in late 2019 as he travelled to a film festival for allegedly blackmailing a co-star. He denied the charges and was convicted to three years' imprisonment, reduced to two on appeal.

References

Further reading 
 
 

 

Afghan actors
Director filmographies
Afghan film directors
Afghan film producers
1957 births
Living people